Get It – Get It is an album by Ike & Tina Turner released on Cenco Records circa 1966. The album contains two previously released singles. "Strange," written by Billy Preston was released from Ike Turner's own label Sonja Records in 1964, and a live version of "I Can't Believe What You Say (For Seeing What You Do)" was released from Kent Records in 1964. The latter single reached No. 95 on the Billboard Hot 100. The title track "Get It – Get It" was released as a single from Cenco in 1967.

Background 
After Ike and Tina's contract with Sue Records ended in 1964, the duo signed with many different labels for the rest of the 1960s. Between 1964 and 1969, they were signed to Kent, Warner Bros./Loma, Modern, Cenco, Philles, Tangerine, Pompeii, Blue Thumb, Minit and A&M. They also released material on the various labels Ike created.

Reissues 
Get It – Get It was reissued by Capitol Records as Her Man . . . His Woman in 1971. Get It – Get It was reissued by Pickwick/33 Records under the same title in 1972. Her Man . . . His Woman was reissued on CD by Universal Music in 2018.

Her Man . . . His Woman 

Once Ike and Tina had a resurgence in the late 1960s, labels they were previously signed to released a multitude of old recordings. Her Man . . . His Woman is a reissue of Get It – Get It released by Capitol Records in 1971. The songs are remixed with strings, horns overdubs and in stereo. The album reached number 201 on Billboard's Bubbling Under the Top LP's.

Critical reception 
Billboard (February 20, 1971): After years of paying dues and appealing to a concerned minority, Ike and Tina are finally beginning to break through. This album, which captures the dynamic duo in typical urgent style, lacks their soul treatment on contemporary progressions rockers, but is down home soul. Examine what Tina does with the blues/gospel warhorse, "My Baby."

Reviewing the album in Christgau's Record Guide: Rock Albums of the Seventies, Robert Christgau wrote:Elevated by the Rolling Stones into mythic status among white people, the Turners are now haunted by their profligate recording habits – Capitol is the tenth label to release an I&TT LP in the past two years. Granted, most and maybe all of them are better than this, a humdrum blues runthrough (with big-band horns and fake-symph strings) on which Ike claims authorship of such works as "Dust My Broom" (here yclept "I Believe") and "Ten Long Years" (here yclept "Five Long Years"). Apparently it was cut some years ago for Cenco (?) Records. The Turners are currently contracted to Liberty, have authorized product out on A&M and Blue Thumb, and caveat emptor.

Track listing 
Length from Her Man . . . His Woman reissue.

Her Man . . . His Woman credits

 Engineer – Ed Flaherty, Hugh Davies
 Executive-Producer – Mauri Lathower
 Horns – Phil Wright
 Producer – David Michaels, Ike Turner
 Strings – Kirby Johnson

References 

1966 albums
1971 albums
Ike & Tina Turner albums
Albums produced by Ike Turner
Blues albums by American artists
Capitol Records albums